The Providence Friars represents Providence College in Women's Hockey East Association play during the 2017–18 NCAA Division I women's ice hockey season.

Offseason
September 24: Christina Putigna was selected to Hockey Canada’s National Women’s Program Strength And Conditioning Camp.

Recruiting

Standings

Roster

2017–18 Friars

Schedule

|-
!colspan=12 style=""| Regular Season

Awards and honors

References

Providence
Providence Friars women's ice hockey